The Atharva Veda (from  and veda, meaning "knowledge") or Atharvana Veda (is the "knowledge storehouse of atharvāṇas, the procedures for everyday life". The text is the fourth Veda, and is a late addition to the Vedic scriptures of Hinduism.

The language of the Atharvaveda is different from Rigvedic Sanskrit, preserving pre-Vedic Indo-European archaisms. It is a collection of 730 hymns with about 6,000 mantras, divided into 20 books. About a sixth of the Atharvaveda texts adapts verses from the Rigveda, and except for Books 15 and 16, the text is mainly in verse deploying a diversity of Vedic meters. Reliable manuscripts of the Paippalada edition were believed to have been lost, but a well-preserved version was discovered among a collection of palm leaf manuscripts in Odisha in 1957.

The Atharvaveda is sometimes called the "Veda of magical formulas", a description considered incorrect by other scholars. In contrast to the 'hieratic religion' of the other three Vedas, the Atharvaveda is said to represent a 'popular religion', incorporating not only  formulas for magic, but also the daily rituals for initiation into learning (upanayana), marriage and funerals. Royal rituals and the duties of the court priests are also included in the Atharvaveda.

The Atharvaveda was likely compiled as a Veda contemporaneously with Samaveda and Yajurveda, or about 1200 BCE – 1000 BCE. Along with the Samhita layer of text, the Atharvaveda includes a Brahmana text, and a final layer of the text that covers philosophical speculations. The latter layer of Atharvaveda text includes three primary Upanishads, influential to various schools of Hindu philosophy. These include the Mundaka Upanishad, the Mandukya Upanishad and the Prashna Upanishad.

Etymology and nomenclature
The Veda may be named, states Monier Williams, after the mythical priest named Atharvan  who was first to develop prayers to fire, offer Soma, and who composed "formulas and spells intended to counteract diseases and calamities". The name Atharvaveda, states Laurie Patton, is for the text being "Veda of the Atharvāṇas".

The oldest name of the text, according to its own verse 10.7.20, was Atharvangirasah, a compound of "Atharvan" and "Angiras", both Vedic scholars. Each scholar called the text after itself, such as Saunakiya Samhita, meaning the "compiled text of Saunakiya". The "Atharvan" and "Angiras" names, states Maurice Bloomfield, imply different things, with the former considered auspicious while the latter implying hostile sorcery practices. Over time, the positive auspicious side came to be celebrated and the name Atharva Veda became widespread. The latter name Angiras which is linked to Agni and priests in the Vedas, states George Brown, may also be related to Indo-European Angirôs found in an Aramaic text from Nippur.

Michael Witzel states the etymology of Atharvan is Proto Indo-Iranian *atharwan "[ancient] priest, sorcerer", and it is cognate to  Avestan āθrauuan "priest" and possibly related to Tocharian *athr, "superior force".

The Atharvaveda is also occasionally referred to as Bhrgvangirasah and Brahmaveda, after Bhrigu and Brahma respectively.

Dating and historical context
The Atharvaveda is dated by Flood at ca. 900 BCE, while Michael Witzel gives a dating at, or slightly after, c. 1200/1000 BCE.

The ancient Indian tradition initially recognized only three Vedas. The Rigveda, the verse 3.12.9.1 of Taittiriya Brahmana, the verse 5.32-33 of Aitareya Brahmana and other Vedic era texts mention only three Vedas. The acceptance of the Atharvanas hymns and traditional folk practices was slow, and it was accepted as another Veda much later than the first three, by both orthodox and heterodox traditions of Indian philosophies. The early Buddhist Nikaya texts, for example, do not recognize Atharvaveda as the fourth Veda, and make references to only three Vedas. Olson states that the ultimate acceptance of Atharvaveda as the fourth Veda probably came in the 2nd half of the 1st millennium BCE. However, notes Max Muller, the hymns of Atharvaveda existed by the time Chandogya Upanishad was completed (~700 BCE), but were then referred to as "hymns of Atharvangirasah".

Frits Staal states that the text may be a compilation of poetry and knowledge that developed in two different regions of ancient India, the Kuru region in northern India and the Pancalas region of eastern India. The former was home to Paippalāda, whose name was derived from the sacred fig tree named Pippala (Sanskrit: पिप्पल). This school's compositions were in the Rigvedic style. The Pancalas region contributions came from composer-priests Angirasas and Bhargavas, whose style was unlike the metric Rigvedic composition, and their content included forms of medical sorcery. The Atharvaveda editions now known are a combination of their compositions.

There is no absolute dating of any Vedic text including the Atharvaveda.

The priests who practised the Atharvaveda were considered to be the lowest tier of Brahmins, in comparison to the priests who practised the Rigveda, Samaveda, or Yajurveda. The stigma against Atharvaveda priests has continued in Odisha well into the modern day.

Text

The Atharvaveda is a collection of 20 books, with a total of 730 hymns of about 6,000 stanzas. The text is, state Patrick Olivelle and other scholars, a historical collection of beliefs and rituals addressing practical issues of daily life of the Vedic society, and it is not a liturgical Yajurveda-style collection.

Recensions

Of these, only the Shaunakiya recension, and the more recently discovered manuscripts of Paippalāda recension have survived. The Paippalāda edition is more ancient. The two recensions differ in how they are organized, as well as content. For example, the Book 10 of Paippalada recension is more detailed and observed carefully not doing a single mistake, more developed and more conspicuous in describing monism, the concept of "oneness of Brahman, all life forms and the world".

Organization
The Atharvaveda Samhita originally was organized into 18 books, and the last two were added later. These books are arranged neither by subject nor by authors (as is the case with the other Vedas), but by the length of the hymns. Each book generally has hymns of about a similar number of verses, and the surviving manuscripts label the book with the shortest hymns as Book 1, and then in an increasing order (a few manuscripts do the opposite). Most of the hymns are poetic and set to different meters, but about a sixth of the book is prose.

Most of the hymns of Atharvaveda are unique to it, except for the one sixth of its hymns that it borrows from the Rigveda, primarily from its 10th mandala. The 19th book was a supplement of a similar nature, likely of new compositions and was added later. The 143 hymns of the 20th book of Atharvaveda Samhita is almost entirely borrowed from the Rigveda.

The hymns of Atharvaveda cover a motley of topics, across its twenty books. Roughly, the first seven books focus primarily on magical poems for all sorts of healing and sorcery, and Michael Witzel states these are reminiscent of Germanic and Hittite sorcery stanzas, and may likely be the oldest section. Books 8 to 12 are speculations of a variety of topics, while Books 13 to 18 tend to be about life cycle rites of passage rituals.

For the Paippalada edition of Atharvaveda, corresponding texts were Agastya and Paithinasi Sutras but these are lost or yet to be discovered.

Contents
The Atharvaveda is sometimes called the "Veda of magical formulas", an epithet declared to be incorrect by other scholars. The Samhita layer of the text likely represents a developing 2nd millennium BCE tradition of magico-religious rites to address superstitious anxiety, spells to remove maladies believed to be caused by demons, and herbs- and nature-derived potions as medicine. Many books of the Atharvaveda Samhita are dedicated to rituals without magic and to theosophy. The text, states Kenneth Zysk, is one of oldest surviving record of the evolutionary practices in religious medicine and reveals the "earliest forms of folk healing of Indo-European antiquity".

The Atharvaveda Samhita contains hymns many of which were charms, magic spells and incantations meant to be pronounced by the person who seeks some benefit, or more often by a sorcerer who would say it on his or her behalf. The most frequent goal of these hymns, charms, and spells were long life of a loved one or recovery from some illness. In these cases, the affected would be given substances such as a plant (leaf, seed, root) and an amulet. Some magic spells were for soldiers going to war with the goal of defeating the enemy, others for anxious lovers seeking to remove rivals or to attract the lover who is less than interested, some for success at a sporting event, in economic activity, for bounty of cattle and crops, or removal of petty pest bothering a household. Some hymns were not about magic spells and charms, but prayer qua prayer and philosophical speculations.

The contents of the Atharvaveda contrasts with the other Vedas. The 19th century Indologist Weber summarized the contrast as follows,

Jan Gonda cautions that it would be incorrect to label Atharvaveda Samhita as mere compilation of magical formulas, witchcraft and sorcery. While such verses are indeed present in the Samhita layer, a significant portion of the Samhita text are hymns for domestic rituals without magic or spells, and some are theosophical speculations such as "all Vedic gods are One". Additionally, the non-Samhita layers of Atharvaveda text include a Brahmana and several influential Upanishads.

Samhita

Surgical and medical treatment
The Atharvaveda includes mantras and verses for treating a variety of ailments. For example, the verses in hymn 4.15 of the recently discovered Paippalada version of the Atharvaveda, discuss how to deal with an open fracture, and how to wrap the wound with Rohini plant (Ficus Infectoria, native to India):

Charms against fever, jaundice and diseases
Numerous hymns of the Atharvaveda are prayers and incantations wishing a child or loved one to get over some sickness and become healthy again, along with comforting the family members. The Vedic era assumption was that diseases are caused by evil spirits, external beings or demonic forces who enter the body of a victim to cause sickness. Hymn 5.21 of the Paippalāda edition of the text, for example, states,

Remedy from medicinal herbs
Several hymns in the Atharvaveda such as hymn 8.7, just like the Rigveda's hymn 10.97, is a praise of medicinal herbs and plants, suggesting that speculations about the medical and health value of plants and herbs was an emerging field of knowledge in ancient India. The Atharvavedic hymn states (abridged),

Spells and prayers to gain a lover, spouse
The contents of Atharvaveda have been studied to glean information about the social and cultural mores in Vedic era of India. A number of verses relate to spells for gaining a husband, or a wife, or love of a woman, or to prevent any rivals from winning over one's "love interest".

Speculations on the nature of man, life, good and evil
The Atharvaveda Samhita, as with the other Vedas, includes some hymns such as 4.1, 5.6, 10.7, 13.4, 17.1, 19.53-54, with metaphysical questions on the nature of existence, man, heaven and hell, good and evil. Hymn 10.7 of Atharvaveda, for example, asks questions such as "what is the source of cosmic order? what and where is planted this notion of faith, holy duty, truth? how is earth and sky held? is there space beyond the sky? what are seasons and where do they go? does Skambha (literally "cosmic pillar", synonym for Brahman) penetrate everything or just somethings? does Skambha know the future? is Skambha the basis of Law, Devotion and Belief? who or what is Skambha?"

{{Blockquote|'The wonderful structure of Man
(...) How many gods and which were they,
who gathered the breast, the neck bones of man?
how many disposed the two teats? who the two collar bones?
how many gathered the shoulder bones? how many the ribs?
Who brought together his two arms, saying, "he must perform heroism?"
(...) Which was the god who produced his brain, his forehead, his hindhead?
(...) Whence now in man come mishap, ruin, perdition, misery?
accomplishment, success, non-failure? whence thought?
What one god set sacrifice in man here?
who set in him truth? who untruth?
whence death? whence the immortal?
|Atharvaveda 10.2.4 - 10.2.14| Paippalāda Edition (Abridged),}}

The Atharvaveda, like other Vedic texts, states William Norman Brown, goes beyond the duality of heaven and hell,  and speculates on the idea of Skambha or Brahman as the all pervasive monism. Good and evil, Sat and Asat (truth and untruth) are conceptualized differently in these hymns of Atharvaveda, and the Vedic thought, wherein these are not dualistic explanation of nature of creation, universe or man, rather the text transcends these and the duality therein. Order is established out of chaos, truth is established out of untruth, by a process and universal principles that transcend good and evil.Barbara Holdrege (1995), Veda and Torah: Transcending the Textuality of Scripture, State University of New York Press, pages 41-42

Prayer for peace
Some hymns are prayer qua prayer, desiring harmony and peace. For example,

Brahmana
The Atharvaveda includes Gopatha Brahmana text, that goes with Atharva Samhita.

Upanishads
The Atharvaveda has three primary Upanishads embedded within it.

Mundaka Upanishad
The Mundaka Upanishad, embedded inside Atharvaveda, is a poetic-style Upanishad, with 64 verses, written in the form of mantras. However, these mantras are not used in rituals, rather they are used for teaching and meditation on spiritual knowledge. In ancient and medieval era Indian literature and commentaries, the Mundaka Upanishad is referred to as one of the Mantra Upanishads.

The Mundaka Upanishad contains three Mundakams (parts), each with two sections.Max Muller (1962), Manduka Upanishad, in The Upanishads - Part II, Dover Publications, pages 27-42 The first Mundakam, states Roer, defines the science of "Higher Knowledge" and "Lower Knowledge", and then asserts that acts of oblations and pious gifts are foolish, and do nothing to reduce unhappiness in current life or next, rather it is knowledge that frees. The second Mundakam describes the nature of the Brahman, the Atman (Self, Soul), and the path to know Brahman. The third Mundakam continues the discussion and then asserts that the state of knowing Brahman is one of freedom, fearlessness, liberation and bliss. The Mundaka Upanishad is one of text that discuss the pantheism theory in Hindu scriptures.Robert Hume, Mundaka Upanishad, Thirteen Principal Upanishads, Oxford University Press, page 371-372 The text, like other Upanishads, also discusses ethics.

Mandukya Upanishad
The Mandukya Upanishad is the shortest of all the Upanishads, found in the Atharvaveda text. The text discusses the syllable Om, presents the theory of four states of consciousness, asserts the existence and nature of Atman (Soul, Self).

The Mandukya Upanishad is notable for inspiring Gaudapada's Karika, a classic for the Vedanta school of Hinduism. Mandukya Upanishad is among the oft cited texts on chronology and philosophical relationship between Hinduism and Buddhism.

Prashna Upanishad
The Prashna Upanishad is from the Paippalada school of Atharvavedins.

The text contains six Prashna (questions), and each is a chapter with a discussion of answers.Eduard Roer, Prashna Upanishad Bibliotheca Indica, Vol. XV, No. 41 and 50, Asiatic Society of Bengal, pages 119-141 The first three questions are profound metaphysical questions but, states Eduard Roer, do not contain any defined, philosophical answers, are mostly embellished mythology and symbolism. The fourth section, in contrast, contains substantial philosophy. The last two sections discuss the symbol Om and Moksha concept.

The Prashna Upanishad is notable for its structure and sociological insights into the education process in ancient India.

Manuscripts and translations
The Shaunakiya text was published by Rudolf Roth and William Dwight Whitney in 1856, by Shankar Pandurang Pandit in the 1890s, and by Vishva Bandhu in 1960–1962. The first complete English translation was made by Ralph T.H. Griffith in 1895-96, followed shortly by Maurice Bloomfield's translation of about one third of the hymns in 1897. These were followed by a nearly complete translation (missing Book 20) with textual commentary by William Dwight Whitney, published in 1905, which is still cited in contemporary scholarship.Olivelle, P. (1996) Upaniṣads. Oxford: Oxford University Press, p xii

A corrupted and badly damaged version of the  text was edited by Leroy Carr Barret from 1905 to 1940 from a single Kashmirian  manuscript (now in Tübingen). Durgamohan Bhattacharyya discovered palm leaf manuscripts of the Paippalada recension in Odisha in 1957. His son Dipak Bhattacharya has published the manuscripts. Thomas Zehnder translated Book 2 of the Paippalada recension into German in 1999, and Arlo Griffiths, Alexander Lubotsky and Carlos Lopez have separately published English translations of its Books 5 through 15.

The Gopatha Brahmana was translated by Hukam Chand Patyal as a dissertation at Pune University.

Influence

Medicine and health care
Kenneth Zysk states that the "magico-religious medicine had given way to a medical system based on empirical and rational ideas" in ancient India by around the start of Christian era, still the texts and people of India continued to revere the ancient Vedic texts. Rishi Sushruta, remembered for his contributions to surgical studies, credits Atharvaveda as a foundation. Similarly, the verse 30.21 of the Caraka Samhita, states it reverence for the Atharvaveda as follows,

The roots of Ayurveda – a traditional medical and health care practice in India—states Dominik Wujastyk, are in the texts called Caraka Samhita and Sushruta Samhita, both of which say that doctors, when asked, should assert their allegiance and inspiration to be the Vedas, especially Atharvaveda. Khare and Katiyar state that the Indian tradition directly links Ayurveda to Atharvaveda.

Wujastyk clarifies that the Vedic texts are a religious discourse and while herbal health care traditions are found in Atharvaveda, the systematic, scholarly medical literature of ancient India is first found in the Caraka Samhita and Sushruta Samhita.Rachel Berger (2013), Ayurveda Made Modern, Palgrave Macmillan, pages 24-25, 195 note 2 Kenneth Zysk adds Bhela Samhita to this list.

Literature
The verse 11.7.24 of Atharvaveda contains the oldest known mention of the Indic literary genre the Puranas.

The 1st millennium AD Buddhist literature included books of magico-religious mantras and spells for protection from evil influences of non-human beings such as demons and ghosts. These were called Pirita (Pali: Paritta) and Rakkhamanta ("mantra for protection"), and they share premises and style of hymns found in Atharvaveda.Rita Langer (2007), Buddhist Rituals of Death and Rebirth, Routledge, pages 19-23

See also
 Ayurveda
 Charaka Samhita
 Sushruta Samhita
 Upanishads
 Vedas
 Merseburg charms
 Zagovory

References

Sources

 

 
 

Further reading

Alexander Lubotsky, Atharvaveda-Paippalada, Kanda Five, Harvard College (2002).
Thomas Zehnder, Atharvaveda-Paippalada, Buch 2, Idstein (1999).
Dipak Bhattacharya, Paippalada-Samhita of the Atharvaveda, Volume 2, The Asiatic Society (2007).

External links

Ralph Griffith,  The Hymns of the Atharvaveda 1895-96, full text
Maurice Bloomfield, Hymns of the Atharva-veda, Sacred Books of the East'', v. 42 (1897), selection
Śaunaka Recension, "Atharva Veda Saṁhitā" [Sanskrit]. Published at Titus Project. Accessed, 14 April 2014.
William Whitney, Index verborum to the published text of the Atharvaveda Vedas, University of Michigan
Madhav M Deshpande, Recitational Permutations of the Saunakiya Atharvaveda, Harvard University Press, based on six Atharvaveda manuscripts found in Pune, India
The Kashmiri Paippalada Recension of the Atharvaveda, Images of 16th century birch-bark manuscript of Atharvaveda (University access rights required)
George Bolling and Julius Negelein, The Parisistas of the Atharvaveda, Johns Hopkins University (with downloadable PDF file)
Listen to the Audiobook version of Atharvaveda on Pocket FM.

Vedas
Hindu texts